The second season of the American teen drama television series Gossip Girl premiered on The CW on September 1, 2008, and concluded on May 18, 2009, consisting of 25 episodes. Based on the novel series of the same name by Cecily von Ziegesar, the series was developed for television by Josh Schwartz and Stephanie Savage. Every episode title this season was a reference to a film from the 20th century.

Synopsis 
The newly formed Bass-Van der Woodsen family is now regarded as the richest on the Upper East Side. Eleanor Waldorf remarries, causing Blair to struggle with her new blended family. As Nate's family issues intensify, he takes extreme measures that ultimately hurts him and his chances with Vanessa. Lily grows closer to Rufus after three months of marriage than she does to Bart. Chuck is confronted with an unimaginable tragedy that will help him find his calling after high school. Serena, Eric, Dan, and Jenny learn a long-buried secret from Lily and Rufus's past that has come to light.

Cast and characters

Main cast
 Blake Lively as Serena van der Woodsen
 Leighton Meester as Blair Waldorf
 Penn Badgley as Dan Humphrey
 Chace Crawford as Nate Archibald
 Taylor Momsen as Jenny Humphrey
 Ed Westwick as Chuck Bass
 Jessica Szohr as Vanessa Abrams
 Kelly Rutherford as Lily Bass
 Matthew Settle as Rufus Humphrey
 Kristen Bell as Gossip Girl (uncredited)

Valley Girls
 Brittany Snow as Lily Rhodes
 Krysten Ritter as Carol Rhodes
 Andrew McCarthy as Rick Rhodes
 Matt Barr as Keith van der Woodsen
 Shiloh Fernandez as Owen Campos
 Ryan Hansen as Shep
 Cynthia Watros as CeCe Rhodes

Recurring cast
 Mädchen Amick as Catherine Beaton
 Connor Paolo as Eric van der Woodsen
 Patrick Heusinger as Marcus Beaton
 Michelle Hurd as Laurel
 Zuzanna Szadkowski as Dorota Kishlovsky
 Francie Swift as Anne Archibald
 Margaret Colin as Eleanor Waldorf
 Yin Chang as Nelly Yuki
 Amanda Setton as Penelope Shafai
 Nicole Fiscella as Isabel Coates
 Robert John Burke as Bart Bass
 Tamara Feldman as Poppy Lifton
 Dreama Walker as Hazel Williams
 Matt Doyle as Jonathan Whitney
 John Patrick Amedori as Aaron Rose
 Willa Holland as Agnes Andrews
 Wallace Shawn as Cyrus Rose
 Desmond Harrington as Jack Bass
 Michelle Trachtenberg as Georgina Sparks

Guest cast
 Caroline Lagerfelt as CeCe Rhodes
 Laura-Leigh as Amanda Lasher
 David Patrick Kelly as Noah Shapiro
 Jill Flint as Bex Simon
 Cyndi Lauper as herself
 Sam Robards as Howard Archibald
 John Shea as Harold Waldorf
 Linda Emond and Jan Maxwell as Headmistress Queller
 William Abadie as Roman
 Laura Breckenridge as Rachel Carr
 Sebastian Stan as Carter Baizen
 James Naughton as William van der Bilt
 Aaron Tveit as Tripp van der Bilt III
 Armie Hammer as Gabriel Edwards
 Aaron Schwartz as Vanya
 No Doubt as Snowed Out

Episodes

DVD release

References

External links
 List of Gossip Girl season 2 episodes on IMDb

2008 American television seasons
2009 American television seasons